Fruta Conquerors FC is a Guyanese football club in Georgetown. The club competes in the GFF Elite League, the top league of football in Guyana. They were league champions in 2000–01, 2017–18 and 2019. The club is named for their sponsor, the beverage company Fruta. They were an inaugural member of the Elite League in 2015–16.

Honors

League titles 
 Guyana National Football League/GFF Elite League
 Winners (3): 2000–01, 2017-18, 2019

Cups 
 Guyana Mayors Cup
 Winners (3): 1999–2000, 2000–01, 2005–05
 Runners-up (4): 2003–04, 2006–07, 2007–08, 2011
 Kashif & Shanghai Cup
 Winners (2): 2002–03, 2003–04
 Runners-up (1): 1999–2000
 GFA Banks Beer Knockout Tournament
 Runners-up (1): 2011–12
 Sweet 16 Knockout Tournament
 Winners (1): 2003
 Runners-up (1): 2010

Performance in CONCACAF competitions 
Fruta Conquerors's score listed first, as well as the home leg.

2001 CFU Club Championship
First Round v.  W Connection – 2–1, 0–8

2006–07 CFU Club Championship
Fruta Conquerors withdrew from tournament
First Round v.  W Connection – w/o
First Round v.  Puerto Rico Islanders – w/o
First Round v.  Hoppers – w/o

See also 
Football in Guyana
GFF Elite League

References 

Football clubs in Guyana